Bolzano Bellunese is an Italian village, hamlet (frazione) of Belluno, in the Veneto.

Geography
The village is located in north of Belluno, about 5 km from the centre, to the right of the Piave. It is a small town in the midst of the forest, of around 700 inhabitants. There is a sub-frazione, called Gioz. Both villages are found high on the right bank of the river Ardo, where the river passes through a deep valley.

History
Bolzano Bellunese is ancient in origin. The parish church dates back to the fourteenth century and is named for the apostles Saint Peter and Saint Paul. It retains an important cycle of frescoes dedicated to Saint Peter, of uncertain origin. The road below the church leads to Rifugio 7º Alpini, on the slopes of Mount Schiara, considered a World Heritage Site by UNESCO.

References

Bibliography
 Touring club italiano, Belluno e provincia: Feltre, Cortina d'Ampezzo e le Dolomiti bellunesi, Guide verdi d'Italia, Milano: Touring Editore, 2004, p. 45,  (Google Books)

External links
 Website for Bolzano Bellunese
 The churches of Bolzano Bellunese

Belluno
Frazioni of the Province of Belluno